Joseph Parker vs. Junior Fa was a heavyweight professional boxing match contested between former WBO champion Joseph Parker and WBO interim Oriental champion Junior Fa. The bout took place on 27 February 2021, at the Spark Arena in Auckland, New Zealand. The event is co-promoted by David Higgins of Duco Events, Eddie Hearn of Matchroom Boxing and Lou DiBella of DiBella Entertainment, and is considered a history making moment and New Zealand's next "Fight of the Century".

Background
As well as growing up in the same neighbourhood in South Auckland and being members of the same church, Joseph Parker and Junior Fa have a history stretching back to their amateur days, having fought on four occasions with two wins each. Four years after making his professional debut, Parker won his first world title in December 2016 by defeating Andy Ruiz Jr. to capture the vacant WBO heavyweight title. After two successful defences Parker suffered his first professional defeat in March 2018, losing his title in a unification bout against reigning unified champion Anthony Joshua. Following the second loss of his career four months later against Dillian Whyte, Parker went on a three fight winning streak; defeating Alexander Flores in December 2018; Alex Leapai in June 2019; and Shawndell Winters in February 2020.

Junior Fa made his professional debut in 2016. Later that year he began plotting his path to fight against Parker. In 2017, Fa won the vacant New Zealand (NZPBA version) heavyweight title against Daniel Tai. The following year he won the WBO Oriental interim title against Luis Pascual to secure a world ranking. Between August 2018 and August 2019, the WBO consistently ranked Fa higher in the world rankings than Parker.

In September 2018, negotiations began between team Parker and team Fa for a potential fight in December 2018. The fight failed to materialise after the teams could not come to an agreement regarding the purse split, with Parker opting to fight Alexander Flores while Fa fought on the undercard against Rogelio Rossi. At the post-event press conference, Parker's trainer Kevin Barry "unleashed verbal blows" when the possibility of a Parker vs. Fa bout was mentioned. Stating, "It's a joke that he even gets mentioned in the same breath as Joe". Barry said that Fa had already been offered the fight, but, "he said no, I'd rather fight a guy who had seven fights in seven years and lost four of his last seven fights by knockout and who is 37-years-old, come on, give me a fricken break."

Talks between the teams resumed in early 2020, however, they quickly broke down after Parker claimed Fa's team "priced themselves out" while Fa's team reportedly claimed they were given a "lowball" offer. In August Fa's manager, Mark Keddell, said the fight was close to being agreed, stating, "We've sent our final offer to them today and in terms of the money I just cannot see it being a problem. We're talking pennies in the pound here. Junior is keen to fight. He wants to make it happen." On 5 October, New Zealand prime minister Jacinder Ardern announced that the COVID-19 lockdown for New Zealand was being lifted. The following day it was announced that the long-awaited bout is scheduled to take place on 11 December 2020 at the Spark Arena in Auckland.

A month before the fight it was announced that Junior Fa was not medically fit to compete. Junior Fa team saw that Fa wasn't doing so well doing training and energy levels, so they decided to get some bloods done. The fight doctor for the event Dr David Renata said the bloods were not normal and that Junior required surgery. Due to the show being postponed, some of the undercard that was scheduled to be on the show had to go elsewhere to keep their fights going. On 18 December it was announced that Junior Fa surgery was successful and the show was rescheduled for 27 February 2021.

Fight card

Fight details 
Joseph Parker vs. Junior Fa was held at the Spark Arena in Auckland, New Zealand. Tickets for the fight went on sale on 7 October after Duco Events announced that general admission tickets would start from a price of $69. Approximately 9,000 tickets went on sale to the general public. They had elected to go with Ticketmaster for distribution of sales. Corporate tables went on sale privately through Duco events themselves with prices ranging from $495 for a single seat to a maximum of $14,995 for a table of 10 in the front row.

Broadcasting 
Duco events began a new partnership for this event with relatively new sports broadcaster Spark Sport and media company NZME. The fight was televised through a pay-per-view (PPV) produced by Spark Sport and Duco Events. Internationally across the world the event will be broadcast on DAZN. For New Zealand PPV prices began at $39.99 for people wishing to purchase of the event before 26 October. After that date the price goes up to $49.99 until 10 December. On 10 and 11 December the price will go up again to $59.99. David Higgins is aiming to break the New Zealand PPV record which is currently held by the last New Zealand Fight of the Century David Tua vs Shane Cameron. The second highest PPV record in New Zealand is held by Anthony Joshua vs. Joseph Parker and third with highest held by UFC 253 Israel Adesanya vs Paulo Costa.

References

Boxing matches
2020 in boxing
February 2021 sports events in New Zealand
Boxing in New Zealand
Sport in Auckland